Étang de Leucate or Étang de Salses is a lake in Pyrénées-Orientales and Aude, France. At an elevation of 0 m, its surface area is 54 km2. It has been designated as a protected Ramsar site since 2017.

See also
 Corbières Massif

References

Leucate
Gulf of Lion
Ramsar sites in Metropolitan France